Edward Quillan (March 31, 1907 – July 19, 1990) was an American film actor and singer whose career began as a child on the vaudeville stages and silent film and continued through the age of television in the 1980s.

Vaudeville and silent films
Born in Philadelphia, Pennsylvania, into a family of vaudeville performers, Quillan made his stage debut at the age of seven alongside his parents, Scottish-born Joseph Quillan and his wife Sarah, as well as his siblings in their act titled 'The Rising Generation'. By the early 1920s he was called upon by film director Mack Sennett to perform a screen test for Mack Sennett Studios. Sennett signed Quillan to a contract in 1922. 

Quillan's very first film appearance was in the 1922 comedy short Up and at 'Em. His next performance was in the 1926 comedy short The Love Sundae opposite actress Alice Day. His next ten film appearances (all released in 1926) were all comedy shorts that were vehicles for Day. He would spend most of the remaining years of the 1920s in comedy shorts featuring actresses Ruth Taylor and Madeline Hurlock. In 1928, Quillan starred in the Vitaphone short film A Little Bit of Everything, notable because it featured his siblings Marie, Joseph and John in starring roles. Marie Quillan would eventually embark on a film career of her own and appear opposite her brother once more, in the 1929 comedy Nosy Neighbors.  
 
Quillan's first feature-length film was the 1928 comedy-drama Show Folks opposite actress Lina Basquette, in which Quillan appropriately plays a vaudeville dancer.  The film was a modest success and also featured actress Carole Lombard.  Quillan's breakout role (and first dramatic film role) was in the 1929 Cecil B. DeMille directed silent film The Godless Girl.  The film paired Quillan once again with Basquette and starred Marie Prevost and Noah Beery, Sr.  His subsequent exposure from the film landed him a contract with Pathé studios.

Talkies and television

Quillan would remain a popular leading and secondary actor throughout the sound film era and would appear in such notable films as 1935's Mutiny on the Bounty with Clark Gable, Charles Laughton, and Franchot Tone, 1939's Young Mr. Lincoln opposite Henry Fonda and Alice Brady,  as Connie Rivers in  John Ford's 1940 film adaptation of the John Steinbeck novel The Grapes of Wrath opposite Henry Fonda, in 1943's Alaska Highway and It Ain't Hay opposite the comedic duo Abbott and Costello.

Quillan's breezy screen personality was seen in "B" musicals, comedies, and even serials during the 1940s. In 1948 Columbia Pictures producer Jules White teamed Quillan with veteran movie comic Wally Vernon for a series of comedy short subjects. White emphasized extreme physical comedy in these films, and Vernon and Quillan made a good team, enthusiastically engaging in pratfalling, kick-in-the-pants slapstick. The series ran through 1956.

Beginning in the late 1950s, Quillan began to make the transition to television and by the 1960s could be seen frequently appearing as a guest actor in such series as The Andy Griffith Show, Petticoat Junction, Perry Mason, and approximately five appearances on the camp-horror comedy series The Addams Family.  He was a regular on the Anthony Franciosa sitcom Valentine's Day from 1964 to 1965, and from 1968 through 1971 he appeared as Eddie Edson on the comedy Julia opposite actress Diahann Carroll.

Through the 1950s and 1960s, Quillan continued to appear in motion pictures, but in increasingly smaller roles and often in bit parts.  One notable appearance of the era was his role of Sandy in the 1954 Vincente Minnelli directed musical Brigadoon, starring Gene Kelly, Van Johnson and Cyd Charisse. Quillan also appeared in the uncredited role of Mr. Cassidy in the 1969 Gene Kelly film adaptation of Hello, Dolly!, starring Barbra Streisand and Walter Matthau and featuring Louis Armstrong. Quillan appeared in My Three Sons as Mr Hewlett (1961) and also appeared on the western television adventure series The Rifleman as Angus Evans. He appeared twice in the fourth season: in “Mark's Rifle” (episode 150) and “Conflict” (episode 155).

Quillan was cast as Hill Beachy, and as Job Darius, in two 1961 episodes of Death Valley Days

In the 1970s, Quillan made guest appearances on such varied television series as Baretta, Chico and the Man, Gunsmoke, Here's Lucy, and Mannix.  After meeting and befriending actor and director Michael Landon, he played numerous bit roles in the popular television series Little House on the Prairie.  Quillan also performed in the Landon-directed series Highway to Heaven and Father Murphy during the 1980s. Quillan made his last television appearance in a 1987 episode of the television crime-mystery series Matlock.

Death
Quillan died of cancer in North Hollywood, California in 1990 and was interred at the San Fernando Mission Cemetery in Mission Hills, Los Angeles, California.

Selected filmography

 Up and at 'Em (1922)
 Catalina Here I Come (1927, Short) - Eddie - the Cook
 Show Folks (1928) - Eddie Kehoe
 Geraldine (1929) - Eddie Able
 Noisy Neighbors (1929) - Eddie Van Revel
 The Godless Girl (1929) - Samuel 'Bozo' Johnson - The Goat
 The Sophomore (1929) - Joe Collins
 Night Work (1930) - Willie
 Big Money (1930) - Eddie
 Sweepstakes (1931) - Bud Doyle
 The Tip-Off (1931) - Thomas 'Tommy' Jordan
 The Big Shot (1931) - Ray Smith
 Girl Crazy (1932) - Danny Churchill
 Strictly Personal (1933) - Thomas Jefferson Reed
 Broadway to Hollywood (1933) - Ted Hackett III
 Meet the Baron (1933) - Man at Dock (uncredited)
 Hollywood Party (1934) - Bob Benson
 Gridiron Flash (1935) - Thomas Burke
 Mutiny on the Bounty (1935) - Ellison
 The Gentleman from Louisiana (1936) - Tod Mason
 The Mandarin Mystery (1936) - Ellery Queen
 London by Night (1937) - Bill
 Big City (1937) - Mike Edwards
 Swing, Sister, Swing (1938) - Chick 'Satchel Lips' Peters
 Made for Each Other (1939) - Conway
 The Family Next Door (1939) - Sammy Pierce
 The Flying Irishman (1939) - Henry Corrigan
 Young Mr. Lincoln (1939) - Adam Clay
 Hawaiian Nights (1939) - Ray Peters
 Allegheny Uprising (1939) - Anderson
 The Grapes of Wrath (1940) - Connie Rivers
 La Conga Nights (1940) - Titus Endover
 Margie (1940) - Joe
 Dancing on a Dime (1940) - Jack Norcross
 Dark Streets of Cairo (1940) - Jerry Jones
 Where Did You Get That Girl? (1941) - Joe Olsen
 Six Lessons from Madame La Zonga (1941) - Skat
 The Flame of New Orleans (1941) - 3rd Sailor
 Too Many Blondes (1941) - Wally Pelton
 Flying Blind (1941) - Riley
 Kid Glove Killer (1942) - Eddie Wright
 Priorities on Parade (1942) - Sticks O'Hara
 It Ain't Hay (1943) - Harry the Horse
 Follow the Band (1943) - Marvin Howe
 Alaska Highway (1943) - Pompadour 'Shorty' Jones
 Melody Parade (1943) - Jimmy Tracy
 Here Comes Kelly (1943) - James Aloysius 'Jimmy' Kelly
 Hi'ya, Sailor (1943) - Corky Mills
 The Impostor (1944) - Cochery
 Hi, Good Lookin'! (1944) - Dynamo Carson
 This Is the Life (1944) - Gus
 Slightly Terrific (1944) - Charlie Young
 Twilight on the Prairie (1944) - Phil
 Dixie Jamboree (1944) - Jeff Calhoun
 Moonlight and Cactus (1944) - Stubby Lamont
 Dark Mountain (1944) - Willie Dinsmire
 Mystery of the River Boat (1944, Serial) - Jug Jenks
 Jungle Queen (1945) - Chuck Kelly
 Song of the Sarong (1945) - Tony Romans
 Jungle Raiders (1945, Serial) - Joe Riley
 Sensation Hunters (1945) - Ray Lawson
 A Guy Could Change (1946) - George Cummings
 Sideshow (1950) - Big Top
 Brigadoon (1954) - Sandy
 The Ladies Man (1961) - Wolf Man (scenes deleted)
 Who's Got the Action? (1962) - Dingo the Telephone Repairman (uncredited)
 Papa's Delicate Condition (1963) - Tom (uncredited)
 Come Blow Your Horn (1963) - Elevator Boy (uncredited)
 Summer Magic (1963) - Mailman (uncredited)
 Promises! Promises! (1963) - Bartender
 Gunfight at Comanche Creek (1963) - Hotel Clerk
 Take Her, She's Mine (1963) - Gateman (uncredited)
 Move Over, Darling (1963) - Bellboy
 Viva Las Vegas (1964) - Master of Ceremonies (uncredited)
 Advance to the Rear (1964) - Sgt. Smitty (uncredited)
 Zebra in the Kitchen (1965) - Man Watching TV (uncredited)
 The Bounty Killer (1965) - Pianist
 The Ghost and Mr. Chicken (1966) - Elevator Operator (uncredited)
 Frankie and Johnny (1966) - Cashier (uncredited)
 Batman year 2, episode 45 (1967) - Newsie
 Eight on the Lam (1967) - Car Dealer (uncredited)
 The Wicked Dreams of Paula Schultz (1968) - Cologne Salesman (uncredited)
 The Shakiest Gun in the West (1968) - Train Porter (uncredited)
 Did You Hear the One About the Traveling Saleslady? (1968) - Salesman
 Angel in My Pocket (1969) - Reverend Beckwith
 Hello, Dolly! (1969) - Mr. Cassidy (uncredited)
 How to Frame a Figg (1971) - Old Man
 Now You See Him, Now You Don't (1972) - Charlie, School Custodian (uncredited)
 The Strongest Man in the World (1975) - Mr. Willoughby
 Mr. Too Little (1978) - Concessionaire

References

External links/Sources

 
 Eddie Quillan at The International Silent Movie
 Eddie Quillan at The New York Times Movies
 
 

1907 births
1990 deaths
American male film actors
American male silent film actors
American male television actors
Vaudeville performers
Male actors from Philadelphia
Deaths from cancer in California
20th-century American male actors
Burials at San Fernando Mission Cemetery